Ram Lakhan Singh  is an Indian politician. He was elected to the Lok Sabha, lower house of the Parliament of India from the Bhind constituency of Madhya Pradesh  as a member of the Bharatiya Janata Party.

References

External links
Official biographical sketch in Parliament of India website

Lok Sabha members from Madhya Pradesh
India MPs 1996–1997
India MPs 1998–1999
India MPs 1999–2004
India MPs 2004–2009
Bharatiya Janata Party politicians from Madhya Pradesh
1950 births
Living people